Sir Miles Partridge (died 26 February 1552) was an English courtier during the reigns of Henry VIII and Edward VI. He was arrested in 1551, before being convicted of treason and hanged, as part of the factional struggle that followed the fall of Protector Somerset.

Life

He was born to John Partridge (1470–1510) and his wife Agnes, née Bennett.

During the reign of Henry VIII he made himself notorious as a gambler. On one occasion, when playing with the king, he staked on one throw of the dice £100 against the bells of the Jesus Chapel in the churchyard of St. Paul's Cathedral; Partridge won, and had the bells taken down and broken. He was granted the manor of Almondsbury in 1544, and served as High Sheriff of Gloucestershire in 1546–7.

After Edward VI's accession, Partridge attached himself to the Duke of Somerset. He accompanied the Protector to Scotland in 1547. He accepted the surrender of Thornton Castle, fought at the battle of Pinkie on 10 September, and was knighted at Roxburgh on 28 September.

After Somerset's fall, Partridge became implicated in the plot against his successor, John Dudley, 1st Duke of Northumberland; on 7 October 1551 he was accused by Sir Thomas Palmer of having undertaken to raise London and seize the Great Seal of the Realm, with the help of the apprentices. His guilt is not clear: both Palmer and Northumberland subsequently confessed that the evidence was false. He was arrested on 16 October, and imprisoned in the Tower of London; he was afterwards moved, on grounds of ill-health, to the lieutenant's house on Tower Hill, and his wife was allowed to attend him. A commission was appointed for his trial on 29 November. He was convicted of felony, and hanged on Tower Hill on Friday 26 February 1552. Others implicated were executed there the same day: Sir Ralph Vane and alongside him Sir Thomas Arundel and Sir Michael Stanhope beheaded. Partridge was little pitied, says John Strype, since he was credited with the evil deeds of Somerset.

Family
Partridge was at one time possessed of the manor of Kew, Surrey. His wife's name was Jane, and after his death she was granted the manor of Kenn, Devon. By her he had two daughters, Margery and Katherine, who in 1553 obtained restitution by act of parliament. One of them married William Stokebrege, grocer, and in 1563 George Barton, rector of St Mary Abchurch, was imprisoned for committing adultery with her.

Notes

References

Attribution

1552 deaths
People executed under the Tudors for treason against England
Executed English people
English knights
16th-century English people
High Sheriffs of Gloucestershire
People executed by Tudor England by decapitation
People executed under Edward VI of England
Year of birth unknown